The Juvenile Diabetes Cure Alliance (JDCA) is a registered 501(c)(3) non-profit organization dedicated to developing a "practical cure" for type 1 diabetes.  Established in 2010, the organization’s home office is in New York City and it focuses primarily on activity within the United States. The organization advocates for increasing type 1 diabetes cure research and publishes reports on a variety of related topics, including research progress, fundraising utilization, and donor priorities.

Activities include research, publishing, and advocating for T1D donors.  All activities are with the ultimate purpose of bringing about what the organization calls a Practical Cure for type one diabetes.

The organization defines a practical cure as any solution that gives people living with the disease the chance to live a normal, unrestricted life. The clinical requirements a Practical Cure is defined by include testing blood sugars only once a week or less, eating an unrestricted diet, require only a simple regimen of medication, to sleep worry free, to experience minimal to no diabetes side effects, and to experience fast recovery from surgeries.

History

The JDCA was founded in 2010 by Brian Kelly, Chairman of the Board of Activision Blizzard, after his son was diagnosed with type 1 diabetes. Kelly founded the organization to accelerate a cure for type 1 within his son’s lifetime. 

At the time of its founding, the JDCA adopted a business, results focused perspective in an effort to hold major diabetes non-profit fundraising organizations accountable for the absence of measurable goals to track progress and a lack of transparency to the donor public.  One key theme which has remained even as the organization has evolved is that donor priorities and the utilization of funds by major fundraisers should be aligned.   

As of 2018, the JDCA has published over 180 reports on topics related to finding a cure for Type 1 diabetes and has led several advocacy campaigns to bring awareness of need for more cure research funding.

Research and publishing

Between 20 and 40 reports are published per year and are sent via email to an audience that is currently a little over 200,000 people.  There are four main types of reports: Human Trials Research, State of the Cure, Utilization of Funds, and Donor Sentiment.

Human trials research progress

The JDCA tracks and categorizes type 1 diabetes research projects that are in human trials or about to start human trials. The list of projects is updated twice a year. While most projects have remained constant, some have been removed over time for insufficient test results and new ones have been added.

State of the Cure

"State of the Cure for Type 1 Diabetes" report provides an annual overview of all progress toward a T1D cure.

Utilization of funds

The organization evaluates and analyzes the income and expenses of diabetes charities and publishes reports on how the money is utilized.

For example, although both the JDRF and ADA raised about $200 million in 2019, only 37 cents of each dollar raised by the JDRF was attributed to research and the ADA spent less than 10 cents of every dollar on T1D research. 

The organization also believes that executive pay at non-profits like the JDRF and ADA should be tied to cure and treatment advancements that are funded by the organization.

Donor sentiment

Based on survey results, the JDCA publishes the sentiments of the T1D community, including priorities and values.  One finding is that the number one priority of the community is finding a cure and most expect this will happen in the next 10 years.
According to annual community surveys, 97% of T1D donors say that the number one reason they donate is to fund cure research.

Advocating for an increase in type 1 diabetes research

The JDCA advocates for a significant increase in spending on cure research for type 1 diabetes through annual petitions. Its activities have fostered some discussion within the diabetes community.  The 2018 4th Annual More for a T1D Cure petition to increase cure funding acquired 205,000 signatures.

The JDCA also provides services for donors who want to legally stipulate how their gifts will be used.

Criticism

The JDCA’s approach has been controversial for its focus on outcomes and expediency rather than traditional methods of deciding what projects to fund.

Critics of the JDCA have stated that the definition of a cure can vary depending on who you ask. Others argue that a cure by 2035 is unobtainable and that improved diabetes treatments are a more valid outlet for funding than the JDCA acknowledges.

References

Diabetes organizations